Caldas Rugby Clube is a rugby team based in Caldas da Rainha, Portugal. As of the 2012/13 season, they play in the First Division of the Campeonato Nacional de Rugby (National Championship).

Stadium

Complexo Desportivo Das Caldas da Rainha

Squad

João Carlos Vieira - all positions
Bernardo 'Nonu' Gonçalves - prop and centre

Lendas

João Carlos Vieira
Francisco Azinheira
Francisca Batista
Tomás Lamboglia
Rita Maltez
Afonso Pecegueiro
Maria Quaresma
José Contreras
Rodrigo Sebastião
Martim Domingues

Sub-16 Team (Calbuntense)
António Pardal
Martim Domingues
William Awerkerken
Diogo Silva
Francisco Santos
Martim Carvalho
Nicolau
David Patrício
Bernardo Ferreira
Henrique Cristo
Rui Rodrigues
Lucas Lamy
Manel Salgado
Ion Ciumasu
Guilherme
Artur

Staff
Coach: Patricio Lamboglia
Fitness trainer: Jonathan Nolan
Physiotherapist: Renato Figueiredo
Team dietician: Sara Romeiro

External links
Caldas Rugby Clube

Portuguese rugby union teams
Sport in Caldas da Rainha